Gary Lynn Fjellgaard (born August 14, 1937) is a Canadian country music singer-songwriter.

He has released fifteen albums and charted thirty-five songs on the RPM Country Tracks chart between 1977 and 1996, including the Top 10 singles "Walk in the Rain Tonight" (#10, 1987), "The Moon Is Out to Get Me" (with Linda Kidder, No. 10, 1989), "Cowboy in Your Heart" (#7, 1989), "Somewhere on the Island" (#7, 1990), "In My Heart" (with Kidder, No. 10, 1990) and "Train of Dreams" (#10, 1994).

Career

Record label
He launched his own record label, Silver Creek Music, in 2001.

Awards
Fjellgaard's song "Riding on the Wind" was named Single of the Year in 1985 by the Canadian Country Music Association. He also won the 1987 Society of Composers, Authors and Music Publishers of Canada Song of the Year award for writing the Mercey Brothers' hit "Heroes".

Fjellgaard won the 1989 Canadian Country Music Association Award for Male Artist of the Year. He also won three awards for his collaborations with Linda Kidder in 1989, 1990 and 1992.

After several years of nominations, Fjellgaard won the 1993 Juno Award for Best Country Male Vocalist.

He was inducted into the Canadian Country Music Hall of Fame in 2005.

Canadian Country Music Association
 1985 – Single of the Year ("Riding on the Wind")
 1987 – SOCAN Song of the Year ("Heroes")
 1989 – Male Artist of the Year
 1989 – Duo of the Year (with Linda Kidder)
 1990 – Duo of the Year (with Linda Kidder)
 1992 – Vocal Collaboration of the Year (with Linda Kidder)

Juno Awards
 1993 – Best Country Male Vocalist

Discography

Albums

Albums with Valdy

Singles

See also

 List of Canadian musicians
 List of country-music performers
 List of guitarists
 List of singer-songwriters
 Music of Saskatchewan

References

External links
 , his official website
 

1937 births
20th-century Canadian male singers
Canadian country guitarists
Canadian country singer-songwriters
Canadian folk guitarists
Canadian male guitarists
Canadian folk singers
Canadian male singer-songwriters

Juno Award winners
Living people
Musicians from Saskatchewan
20th-century Canadian guitarists
21st-century Canadian guitarists
Canadian Country Music Association Duo of the Year winners
Canadian Country Music Association Male Artist of the Year winners
21st-century Canadian male singers
Stony Plain Records artists